Easton Airport may refer to:

 Easton Airport (Maryland), or Newnam Field, in Easton, Maryland, United States (FAA: ESN)
 Easton State Airport in Easton, Washington, United States (FAA: ESW)
 Easton/Valley View Airport in Greeley, Colorado, United States (FAA: 11V)

Other airports serving places named Easton

 Braden Airpark in Easton, Pennsylvania, United States (FAA: N43)
 Lehigh Valley International Airport serving Allentown, Bethlehem and Easton, in Pennsylvania, United States (FAA: ABE)